Gwyneth Evelyn "Gwen" Verdon (January 13, 1925October 18, 2000) was an American actress and dancer. She won four Tony Awards for her musical comedy performances, and served as an uncredited choreographer's assistant and specialty dance coach for theater and film. Verdon was a critically acclaimed performer on Broadway in the 1950s, 1960s, and 1970s, having originated many roles in musicals, including Lola in Damn Yankees, the title character in Sweet Charity and Roxie Hart in Chicago. She is also strongly identified with her second husband, director-choreographer Bob Fosse, remembered as the dancer-collaborator-muse for whom he choreographed much of his work and as the guardian of his legacy after his death.

Early life
Verdon was born in Culver City, California, the second child of Gertrude Lilian ( Standring) and Joseph William Verdon, British immigrants to the United States by way of Canada. Her brother was William Farrell Verdon. Her father was an electrician at MGM Studios, and her mother was a former vaudevillian of the Denishawn dance troupe, as well as a dance teacher.

As a toddler, she suffered from rickets, which left her legs so badly misshapen she was called "Gimpy" by other children and spent her early years in orthopedic boots and rigid leg braces. At age three, her mother enrolled her in dance classes. Further ballet training strengthened her legs and improved her carriage.

By age six, she was dancing on stage. She went on to study multiple dance forms, ranging from tap, jazz, ballroom and flamenco to Balinese. She also studied juggling. At age 11, she appeared as a solo ballerina in the musical romance film The King Steps Out (1936), directed by Josef von Sternberg and starring Grace Moore and Franchot Tone. She attended Hamilton High School in Los Angeles and studied under ballet enthusiast Ernest Belcher. While in high school, she was cast in a revival of Show Boat.

In 1942, Verdon's parents asked her to marry family friend and tabloid reporter James Henaghan after he got her pregnant at 17 years old, and she quit her dancing career to raise their child. In 1945, she appeared as a dancer in the movie musical Blonde From Brooklyn. After her divorce, she entrusted her son Jimmy to the care of her parents.

Career

Early on, Verdon found a job as assistant to choreographer Jack Cole, whose work was respected by both Broadway and Hollywood movie studios. During her five-year employment with Cole, she took small roles in movie musicals as a "specialty dancer". She also taught dance to stars such as Jane Russell, Fernando Lamas, Lana Turner, Rita Hayworth, Betty Grable and Marilyn Monroe.

Verdon started out on Broadway going from one chorus line to another. Her breakthrough role finally came when choreographer Michael Kidd cast her as the second female lead in Cole Porter's musical Can-Can (1953), starring French prima donna Lilo. Out-of-town reviewers hailed Verdon's interpretation of Eve in the Garden of Eden ballet as a performance that upstaged the show's star, who reputedly demanded Verdon's role be cut to only two featured dance numbers. With her role reduced to little more than an ensemble part, Verdon formally announced her intention to quit by the time the show premiered on Broadway. But her opening-night Garden of Eden performance was so well-received that the audience screamed her name until the startled actress was brought from her dressing room in a towel to take a curtain call. Verdon received a pay increase and her first Tony Award for her performance.

Verdon's biggest critical and commercial success was her following show, George Abbott's Damn Yankees (1955), based on the novel The Year the Yankees Lost the Pennant. The musical ran for 1019 performances. Verdon won another Tony and went to Hollywood to repeat her role in the 1958 movie version Damn Yankees, famously singing "Whatever Lola Wants". (Fosse can be seen partnered with her in the original mambo duet "Who's Got the Pain".)

Verdon won another Tony for her performance in the musical New Girl in Town as a hard-luck girl fleeing from her past as a prostitute. She won her fourth Tony for the murder-mystery musical Redhead, Fosse's Broadway debut as a director/choreographer. In 1960, Fosse and Verdon wed.

In 1966, Verdon returned to the stage in the role of Charity in Sweet Charity, which like many of her earlier Broadway triumphs was choreographed and directed by husband Fosse. The show is loosely based on Federico Fellini's screenplay for Nights of Cabiria. It was followed by a movie version starring  Shirley MacLaine as Charity, featuring Ricardo Montalbán, Sammy Davis Jr. and Chita Rivera, with Fosse at the helm of his very first film as director and choreographer. Verdon helped with the choreography. The numbers include the famed "Big Spender", "Rhythm of Life", "If My Friends Could See Me Now", and "I'm a Brass Band". Verdon also traveled to Berlin to help Fosse with Cabaret, the musical film for which he won an Oscar for Best Director.

Although estranged as a couple, Verdon and Fosse continued to collaborate on projects such as the musical Chicago (1975) (in which she originated the role of murderess Roxie Hart) and the musical Dancin' (1978), as well as Fosse's autobiographical movie All That Jazz (1979). The helpmate/peer played by Leland Palmer in that film is based on the role Verdon played in Fosse's real life.  She also developed a close working relationship with Fosse's partner, Broadway dancer Ann Reinking, and was an instructor for Reinking's musical theatre classes.

After originating the role of Roxie opposite Chita Rivera's Velma Kelly in Chicago, Verdon focused on film acting, playing character roles in movies such as The Cotton Club (1984), Cocoon (1985) and Cocoon: The Return (1988). She continued to teach dance and musical theater and to act. She received three Emmy Award nominations for appearances on Magnum, P.I. (1988), Dream On (1993) and Homicide: Life on the Street (1993). Verdon appeared as the title character's mother in the Woody Allen movie Alice (1990) and as Ruth in Marvin's Room (1996), co-starring Meryl Streep, Diane Keaton, and Leonardo DiCaprio. In 1999, Verdon served as artistic consultant on a Broadway musical designed to showcase examples of classic Fosse choreography.  Called simply Fosse, the revue was conceived and directed by Richard Maltby Jr. and Ann Reinking and choreographed by Reinking and Chet Walker. Verdon's daughter Nicole received a "special thanks" credit. The show won a Tony Award for Best Musical.

In 1997 Verdon appeared in an episode of Walker Texas Ranger as Maisie Whitman. She reprised the role in 1999.

Verdon played Alora in the movie Walking Across Egypt (1999) and appeared in the film Bruno, released in 2000. Verdon received a total of four Tonys, for best featured actress for Can-Can (1953) and best leading actress for Damn Yankees (1955), New Girl in Town (1957) and Redhead (1959). She also won a Grammy Award for the cast recording of Redhead.

Verdon was inducted into the American Theater Hall of Fame in 1981. In 1998, she was awarded the National Medal of Arts.

Personal life
Verdon was married twice and had two children. She married tabloid reporter James Archibald Henaghan in 1942. They had a son, Jim, the following year and divorced in 1947. In 1960, Verdon married choreographer Bob Fosse. They had a daughter, Nicole, in 1963. Fosse's extramarital affairs put a strain on their marriage, and by 1971, Verdon and Fosse were separated, but never divorced. She was involved in relationships with actor Scott Brady and actor Jerry Lanning, son of Roberta Sherwood. Verdon was with Fosse when he suffered a fatal heart attack at the Willard Hotel in Washington, D.C., in September 1987.

Verdon was a cat fancier, having up to six cats at one time, with the pets carrying names such as "Feets Fosse", "Junie Moon", and "Tidbits Tumbler Fosse".

Verdon was a mental health-care advocate; later in life, she openly spoke about the positive effects of mental-health counseling. Along with teaching dance as a form of therapy, she sat on the board of directors for the New York Postgraduate Center for Mental Health, and actively raised funds to support mental health-care research.

Popular culture
 
Fosse/Verdon is an 8-part American miniseries starring Sam Rockwell as Fosse and Michelle Williams as Verdon. The series, which tells the story of the couple's troubled personal and professional relationship, is based on the biography Fosse by Sam Wasson. It premiered in eight parts on April 9, 2019, on FX. At the 71st Primetime Emmy Awards, Fosse/Verdon received seventeen nominations, including Outstanding Limited Series and acting nominations for Rockwell, Williams, and Margaret Qualley (as Ann Reinking). Williams won the Emmy for Outstanding Actress in a Limited Series.

Death and legacy
Verdon died from a heart attack on October 18, 2000, aged 75, at her daughter's home in Woodstock, Vermont. Later that night, at 8 pm, all marquee lights on Broadway were dimmed in a tribute to Verdon.

Work

Stage

Film

Television

Music
In 1956, Verdon released an album titled The Girl I Left Home For. The album includes her covers of popular jazz standards of the time.

Awards and nominations
{| class="wikitable"
|-
!Year
!Award 
!Category
!Work
!Result
!Ref.
|-
|1953
|Theatre World Award
|
|rowspan=2|Can-Can
|
|-
|1954
|rowspan=6|Tony Award
|Best Featured Actress in a Musical
|
|
|-
|1956
|rowspan=5|Best Leading Actress in a Musical
|Damn Yankees
|
|
|-
|1958
|New Girl in Town †
|
|
|-
|1959
|Redhead
|
|
|-
|1966
|Sweet Charity
|
|
|-
|1976
|Chicago
|
|
|-
|1960
|Grammy Award
|Best Broadway Show Album
|Redhead ††
|
|
|-
| 1959 
|BAFTA Awards
|Most Promising Newcomer to Leading Film Roles
|Damn Yankees
|
|
|-
| 1966 
|Outer Critics Circle Award
|Outstanding Performance
| Sweet Charity 
|
|
|-
|1979
|Los Angeles Drama Critics Circle Award
|Choreography
|Dancin' †††
|
|
|-
|1988
|rowspan=3|Primetime Emmy Awards
|Outstanding Guest Actress in a Drama Series
|Magnum, P.I.|
|
|-
|rowspan=2|1993
|Outstanding Guest Actress in a Comedy Series
|Dream On| 
|
|-
|Outstanding Guest Actress in a Drama Series
|Homicide: Life on the Street| 
|
|-
|rowspan=2|1997
|rowspan=2|Screen Actors Guild Awards
|Outstanding Actress in a Supporting Role
|rowspan=2|Marvin's Room| 
|
|-
| Outstanding Ensemble Cast in a Motion Picture
| 
|
|-
|}

† Tied with co-star Thelma Ritter
 
†† Tied with Ethel Merman for Gypsy''

††† Shared with Bob Fosse

References

External links
 
 
 

1925 births
2000 deaths
20th-century American actresses
20th-century American dancers
20th-century American singers
20th-century American women singers
Actresses from California
Alexander Hamilton High School (Los Angeles) alumni
American female dancers
American film actresses
American jazz dancers
American musical theatre actresses
American people of British descent
American people of Canadian descent
Dancers from California
Donaldson Award winners
Grammy Award winners
People from Culver City, California
People with polio
Singers from California
Tony Award winners
United States National Medal of Arts recipients